Geirr Lystrup (born 22 March 1949) is a Norwegian singer, poet, playwright and children's writer. He was born in Vinje. His debut album was Ti på taket og Måltrostblues from 1972. His album Songen om kjærligheta from 1981 (a cooperation with Det Norske Kammerkor) was awarded Spellemannprisen. He was awarded Prøysenprisen in 1987. He has played with the music group Godtfolk, and their first album Egg og Champagne from 1988 was awarded Spellemannprisen. Among his plays is Brakar og Joanna, staged at Riksteatret at its 50th anniversary in 1999.

References

1949 births
Living people
People from Vinje
Norwegian male singers
Norwegian male poets
Norwegian children's writers
20th-century Norwegian dramatists and playwrights
Norwegian male dramatists and playwrights
20th-century Norwegian male writers
21st-century Norwegian dramatists and playwrights
21st-century Norwegian male writers